The Northern California Coastal Wild Heritage Wilderness Act is a U.S. federal law enacted in 2006 that enlarged existing wilderness boundaries and created new wilderness areas for protection under the National Wilderness Preservation System.  These newly designated protected wilderness areas help safeguard habitat for more than 250 endangered species including the California condor and the bristlecone pine, the oldest living trees on earth.

It also added Wild and Scenic status to sections of the Black Butte River, created the Cow Mountain Recreation Area and designated the Elkhorn Ridge Potential Wilderness Area.

The Act was sponsored by Representative Mike Thompson and Senators Barbara Boxer and Dianne Feinstein, and was signed into law on October 17, 2006.

Timeline 

May 21, 2002-

Senator Barbara Boxer introduces California Wild Heritage Act of 2002 (S. 2535) in the 107th United States Congress.

" In short, this bill preserves, prevents, and it protects." - Senator Boxer

Referred to Senate Committee on Energy and Natural Resources. This bill was not enacted.

March 27, 2003-

Bills are introduced in 108th Congress.
House of Representatives:
H.R. 1501, Northern California Coastal Wild Heritage Wilderness Act of 2003 introduced by Representative Mike Thompson.
Senate:
S. 738, introduced by Senator Barbara Boxer.

October 16, 2003-

Companion bills introduced in U.S. House of Representatives:
H.R. 3325, Southern California Wild Heritage Wilderness and Wild Rivers Act of 2003, introduced by Representative Hilda Solis.
HR 3327, Representative Mike Thompson's bill titled Northern California Wilderness and Wild Rivers  is introduced.

March 4, 2004-

Senator Dianne Feinstein joins Senator Boxer and Representative Mike Thompson in supporting the bill.

December 8, 2004-

U.S. Senate passes Senate bill 738, which was bundled together with several other bills collectively titled H.R. 620. It was then sent to the House for consideration, but the House adjourned before action was taken.

January 4, 2004-

House bill  H.R. 233 introduced in the 109th Congress.
Committee and Subcommittee hearings held Feb. 3, 2005 to July 19, 2006.

January 14, 2005-

Senate bill S. 128  is introduced.
Passed Senate by unanimous consent and was sent to the House July 26, 2005.

July 24, 2006-

Debate on bill for 40 minutes.

October 5, 2006-

Bill was presented to President of the United States.

October 17, 2006-

Bill is signed and becomes Public Law No. 109-362

Details

Notes

References 
  The complete text of this law in PDF format. retrieved April 4, 2008

The Wilderness.net pages on each new / expanded wilderness areas, with detail of acreage by agency:
  Siskiyou Wilderness
  Snow Mountain Wilderness
  Trinity Alps Wilderness
  Yolla Bolly-Middle Eel Wilderness
  Sanhedrin Wilderness
  Yuki Wilderness
  Mount Lassic Wilderness
  Cache Creek Wilderness
  Cedar Roughs Wilderness
  South Fork Eel River Wilderness
  King Range Wilderness

See also
  San Francisco Chronicle's columnist Tom Steinstra's article (dated Oct. 2002) concerning fraud charges against Senator Boxer by mountain biking groups.  retrieved April 4, 2008

  Press release of a working agreement between several mountain biking clubs and wilderness advocates, from a meeting held at Reno, Nevada on March 19-20, 2002

 The Wilderness Act of 1964

Northern California
Protected areas of California 
United States federal public land legislation